Balázs Sinkó (born 9 February 1979 in Hungary) is a Hungarian retired footballer.

References

Hungarian footballers
1979 births
Association football midfielders
Living people
Monori SE players
Szolnoki MÁV FC footballers
Budapesti VSC footballers
Vác FC players